Zhang Huikang (born 22 July 1962) is a Chinese football goalkeeper who played for China in the 1988 Asian Cup. He also played for Shanghai city team and South China in Hong Kong.

Career statistics

International statistics

External links
Team China Stats

1962 births
1988 AFC Asian Cup players
Footballers at the 1988 Summer Olympics
Olympic footballers of China
China international footballers
Chinese footballers
Living people
Footballers at the 1990 Asian Games
Association football goalkeepers
Asian Games competitors for China
Shanghai Shenhua F.C. players
south China AA players